Terry Morse (born September 15, 1946) is an American biathlete. He competed in the 20 km individual event at the 1972 Winter Olympics.

References

1946 births
Living people
American male biathletes
Olympic biathletes of the United States
Biathletes at the 1972 Winter Olympics
Sportspeople from Bridgeport, Connecticut